Boettger's ground skink (Scincella boettgeri)  is a species of lizard in the family Scincidae. The species is native to the Ryukyu Islands of Japan.

Etymology
The specific name, boettgeri, is in honor of German herpetologist Oskar Boettger.

Geographic range
S. boettgeri is found in the Miyako and Yaeyama island groups of the southern Ryukyu Islands.

Habitat
The preferred natural habitat of S. boettgeri is forest.

Behavior
S. boettgeri is terrestrial.

Diet
S. boettgeri preys upon insects and spiders.

Reproduction
S. boettgeri is oviparous. Clutch size is 4–11 eggs.

References

Further reading
Greer AE (1974). "The genetic relationships of the scincid lizard genus Leiolopisma and its relatives". Australian Journal of Zoology Supplemental Series 22 (31): 1–67.
Van Denburgh J (1912). "Concerning Certain Species of Reptiles and Amphibians from China, Japan, the Loo Choo Islands, and Formosa". Proceedings of the California Academy of Sciences, Fourth Series 3: 187–257. (Leiolopisma laterale boettgeri, new subspecies, p. 239).

Scincella
Reptiles described in 1912
Taxa named by John Van Denburgh